Fairmont Kuala Lumpur Towers or Fairmont KL Tower (Fairmont KL Tower 1 & Fairmont KL Tower 2) is a pair of mixed-use twin buildings which is currently stalled since 2018 in Kuala Lumpur City Centre, Kuala Lumpur developed by KLCC Property Holdings and QD Asia Pacific. The construction started in 2014.

Gallery

References

Skyscrapers in Kuala Lumpur
Twin towers